Jerel Romaine Blassingame (born September 12, 1981) is an American professional basketball player for AIK Basket of the Swedish second-tier Superettan.

Amateur career
Blassingame played at Redirection High School in Brooklyn, New York, before attending Los Angeles City College, where he helped the team win a California state championship in 2002–03. He was named MVP of the state tournament, and was an All-Southcoast Conference selection that year.

He later transferred to UNLV, where he averaged 11.2 ppg and 6.6 assists in his junior season (2003–04). In his senior year, he averaged 8.9 ppg and 5.5 apg.

Professional career
Before beginning his career in Finland, Blassingame played with Maccabi Rishon LeZion in the Israeli League. He also played in the Swedish Obol Basketball League, with the Solna Vikings. Prior to his career with Solna, he played with ENAD in the Cypriot League and AEK Athens BC in the Greek League. For the 2009–10 season, he was the starting point guard for BC Odesa in Ukraine. In the 2010–11 season Blassingame was a key player for Energa Czarni Słupsk, the leader of the Polish Basket League. In the winter season Energa Czarni Słupsk finished with a win–loss record of 10–1, and Blassingame averaged 12.4 points per game and 6.2 assists per game. In August 2011 he signed with Asseco Prokom Gdynia. After a season and a half in Poland, Blassingame moved to Croatia, signing for Cibona Zagreb. He helped them win the ABA League title in the 2013–14 season. In December 2014 he terminated his contract with Cibona.

On December 7, 2014 he signed with Polish club Energa Czarni Słupsk. On January 9, 2017, he parted ways with Czarni Słupsk. On January 24, 2017, he returned to the Greek Basket League and signed with Promitheas Patras in order to replace the injured Keydren Clark, who was released.

References

External links
 realGM profile 
 Polish League profile (Polish)
 Finnish League profile 

1981 births
Living people
08 Stockholm Human Rights players
ABA League players
AEK B.C. players
African-American basketball players
American expatriate basketball people in Croatia
American expatriate basketball people in Cyprus
American expatriate basketball people in Finland
American expatriate basketball people in France
American expatriate basketball people in Greece
American expatriate basketball people in Israel
American expatriate basketball people in Poland
American expatriate basketball people in Sweden
American expatriate basketball people in Ukraine
American men's basketball players
Basketball players from New York City
Asseco Gdynia players
BC Odesa players
Czarni Słupsk players
Élan Béarnais players
Israeli Basketball Premier League players
Los Angeles City Cubs men's basketball players
KK Cibona players
Maccabi Rishon LeZion basketball players
Olympique Antibes basketball players
Promitheas Patras B.C. players
Sportspeople from Brooklyn
UNLV Runnin' Rebels basketball players
Point guards
21st-century African-American sportspeople
20th-century African-American people